Washington Street Cemetery is a historic cemetery located at Geneva in Ontario County, New York. The cemetery was laid out in 1832 and the entry is distinguished by a handsome cast iron arch dating from the 1840s / 1850s.  It contains about 2,200 burials dating from 1832 to the 1950s.

It was listed on the National Register of Historic Places in 2002.

Notable burial
 Eliakim Sherrill
 Samuel Miles Hopkins
 Joseph Gardner Swift the first graduate of West Point Military Academy

References

Cemeteries on the National Register of Historic Places in New York (state)
1832 establishments in New York (state)
Cemeteries in Ontario County, New York
Geneva, New York
National Register of Historic Places in Ontario County, New York